Maclaurin or MacLaurin is a surname. Notable people with the surname include:

 Colin Maclaurin (1698–1746), Scottish mathematician
 Normand MacLaurin (1835–1914), Australian politician and university administrator
 Henry Normand MacLaurin (1878–1915), Australian general
 Ian MacLaurin, Baron MacLaurin of Knebworth
 Richard Cockburn Maclaurin (1870–1920), US physicist and educator

See also
 Taylor series in mathematics, a special case of which is the Maclaurin series 
 Maclaurin (crater), a crater on the Moon
 McLaurin (disambiguation)
 MacLaren (surname)
 McLaren (disambiguation)

Clan MacLaren